Moodlu is a rural locality in the Moreton Bay Region, Queensland, Australia.

Geography

The D'Aguilar Highway runs through from east to west. The Caboolture Connection Road, formerly part of the D'Aguilar Highway, leaves the highway in Moodlu and runs south-east to Caboolture.

The proposed Bruce Highway Western Alternative will pass through Moodlu from south to north.

History
The locality takes its name from its railway station which is a Kabi word meaning stone.

Moodlu Post Office opened on 1 July 1927 (a receiving office had been open from 1910) and closed in 1953.

Wararba Provisional School opened circa 1884. On 1 January 1909, it became Waraba State School. In 1911, it was renamed Moodlu State School. The school closed on 4 July 1947. It was on a  site at 199 Williams Road. The site is now the Caboolture Pony Club.

The median age of the Moodlu population was 46 years, 9 years above the national median of 37. 74.8% of people living in Moodlu were born in Australia. The other top responses for country of birth were England 7.1%, New Zealand 5.5%, Germany 2.1%, India 1.3%, Lithuania 1.3%. 88.6% of people spoke only English at home; the next most common languages were 3.4% Italian, 2.5% German, 1.7% Filipino, 0% Irish, 0% Gaelic (Scotland).

Education 
There are no schools in Moodlu. The nearest government primary and secondary schools are Tullawong State School and Tullawong State High School, both in neighbouring Caboolture to the south-east.

References

Suburbs of Moreton Bay Region
Localities in Queensland